Sjögren–Larsson syndrome is a rare autosomal recessive form of ichthyosis with neurological symptoms. It can be identified by a triad of medical disorders. The first is ichthyosis, which is a buildup of skin to form a scale-like covering that causes dry skin and other problems. The second identifier is paraplegia which is characterized by leg spasms. The final identifier is intellectual delay.

SLS is caused by a mutation in the fatty aldehyde dehydrogenase gene found on chromosome 17. In order for a child to receive SLS both parents must be carriers of the SLS gene. If they are carriers their child has a  chance of getting the disease. In 1957 Sjögren and Larsson proposed that the Swedes with the disease all descended from a common ancestor 600 years ago. Today only 30–40 persons in Sweden have this disease.

Signs and symptoms 

 Dry and scaly skin similar to all other ichtyosiforms (types of ichthyosis).
 Neurological problems – this can often cause mild paralysis in the legs
 Mild to moderate intellectual disability.
 Often associated ocular features, which include pigmentary changes in the retina.
The usual presentation of crystalline maculopathy is from the age of 1–2 years onwards.

Causes
It is associated with a deficiency of the enzyme fatty aldehyde dehydrogenase (ALDH3A2) which is encoded on the short arm of chromosome 17 (17p11.2). At least 11 distinct mutations have been identified.

Without a functioning fatty aldehyde dehydrogenase enzyme, the body is unable to break down medium- and long-chain fatty aldehydes which then build up in the membranes of the skin and brain.

This condition is inherited in an autosomal recessive pattern.

Diagnosis
Diagnosis is made with a blood test which sees if the activity of the fatty aldehyde dehydrogenase enzyme is normal. Gene sequencing can also be used, which can additionally be used by would-be parents to see if they are carriers.

Treatment
The ichthyosis is usually treated with topical ointment. Anti-convulsants are used to treat seizures and the spasms may be improved with surgery.

Eponym
It was characterized by Torsten Sjögren and Tage Konrad Leopold Larsson (1905–1998), a Swedish medical statistician. It should not be confused with Sjögren's syndrome, which is a distinct condition named after a different person, Henrik Sjögren.

See also 
 Shabbir syndrome
 List of cutaneous conditions

References

Further reading

External links 

Genodermatoses
Syndromes affecting the skin
Fatty-acid metabolism disorders
Syndromes affecting the nervous system
Rare diseases